German Evangelical Salem Church is a historic church in Tyrone Township, Le Sueur County, Minnesota.  It was built in 1870 by German immigrants who settled and farmed northwestern Le Sueur County, and was added to the National Register in 1982.  It was nominated for being a rare surviving example of an early rural church built to anchor an immigrant farming community.

References

Buildings and structures in Le Sueur County, Minnesota
Churches completed in 1870
Churches on the National Register of Historic Places in Minnesota
German-American culture in Minnesota
Greek Revival church buildings in Minnesota
National Register of Historic Places in Le Sueur County, Minnesota
1870 establishments in Minnesota